James Kelvin Burnett (June 16, 1926 – December 22, 2018) was a Canadian ice hockey centre. He played in the NHL for the New York Rangers.

References

External links
 

1926 births
Anglophone Quebec people
Canadian ice hockey centres
2018 deaths
New York Rangers players
People from Lachine, Quebec
Ice hockey people from Montreal